Tapirus rioplatensis is an extinct species of tapir that lived in South American swamps and forests during the Pleistocene and was probably the ancestor of all South American tapirs alive today.

References

Prehistoric tapirs
Prehistoric mammals of South America